Oskarshamn Shipyard is a shipbuilding and repair facility located in Oskarshamn, Sweden.

General information
The shipyard company was established in 1863, when a dry dock was built in Oskarshamn. About 540 vessels have been built and launched at the shipyard since then. In the 1960s, the company had a working force of about 1,450 people.
 
The Oskarshamn shipyard is still active. Some of the facilities are floating drydock, gantry crane, slipway, and 318 metres of quay.

Ships built at the shipyard
Below is a gallery of some of the ships built at Oskarshamn Shipyard:

References

 Literature: Hofrén, M: Oskarshamn 1856-1956.
 Oskarshamnsvarvet Sweden

Oskarshamn
Shipyards of Sweden